Blue Stone is an American electropop musical project formed by producer/programmer Robert Smith and producer/multi-instrumentalist Bill Walters, and featuring various female guest vocalists. The group has released three studio albums and one remix album, all on Neurodisc Records, since 2006.

Musical style and influences
Blue Stone's style and genre have been described as "Ethereal Pop," "Ambient Pop," "Dream Pop," and "New Age" by critics. Their music integrates layered hardware and software synthesizers with live piano, vocals, and percussion.

Robert Smith and Bill Walters are the group's core members, who write the majority and produce all of Blue Stone's output. They collaborate with various female guest vocalists, some of whom are credited as co-writers of songs. 
Prior to forming Blue Stone, Smith released music in the New Age genre as Bella Sonus. He and Walters have experience performing together as bandmates in Rock and Blues projects in prior decades. The two have cited a variety of musical artists, including Pink Floyd, Jan Hammer, William Orbit, Delerium, BT, and Afro Celt Sound System, as having been influential in developing their sound.

History
Blue Stone's first studio album, Breathe, was released in 2006 and received mixed reviews. Breathe features one guest vocalist, Darcy, on numerous songs, which are a combination of free-form composition and traditional verse/chorus songwriting. The album performed well on the iTunes Store's Electronic Album Chart Top 100.
Worlds Apart was released in 2007 to uniformly positive reviews, and included three guest vocalists (Rivers, Sandlin, and Hurley), each performing on multiple songs. This album represented a shift toward a majority of conventionally written (verse/chorus-type) songs that continued in the 2009 release Messages, which was also well received by critics.

Breathe

 "Confession"
 "Breathe"
 "Break of Dawn"
 "Falling"
 "The River"
 "I Am"
 "Forgiven"
 "Only One"
 "Holy Ground"
 "Searching"
 "Contact"
 "Dusk"
 "Traveler"
 "Lost"
 "New Beginning"

Worlds Apart

 "Set Adrift"
 "Waters Flow"
 "Lost Sun"
 "Dreamcatcher"
 "Voleti"
 "Worlds Apart (Searching for You)"
 "Envy"
 "Take Flight"
 "Far Away"
 "Labyrinth of Dreams"
 "Tears"
 "Event Horizon"
 "Remember This"
 "On the Wind"
 "Circles"
 "Flood"

Worlds Apart Remixed

 "Dreamcatcher (Leaving the Ledge Mix)" (06:39)
 "Worlds Apart (Dark Mix)" (07:30)
 "Event Horizon (Smoldering Mix)" (06:15)
 "Waters Flow (Heavy Mix)" (05:34)
 "Adrift (Civilized Mix)" (06:47)
 "Worlds Apart (Burning Mix)" (04:46)
 "Faraway (Runaway Mix)" (05:14)
 "Tears (Wish for Light Mix)" (07:07)
 "Worlds Apart (Hear the Memory Mix)" (06:37)
 "Circles (Round and Round Mix)" (05:59)
 "Tears Are Falling" (New Track) (05:48)
 "Event Horizon (Live Acoustic)" (04:52)

Messages

 "Midnight Tides" (feat. Sara Bloomfield) 
 "Open Your Eyes" (feat. Sheyenne Rivers)
 "Deja Vu" (feat. Sara Bloomfield)
 "Hang On" (feat. Bridin Brennan, Karen Hamill)
 "Wait for the Sun" (feat. Sheyenne Rivers, Veronika Gunter)
 "Open Sky" (feat. Samantha Sandlin)
 "Lotus Bloom" (feat. Sara Bloomfield)
 "Come Alive" (feat. Sheyenne Rivers)
 "Moving Forward" (feat. Samantha Sandlin)
 "Ancient Echoes" (feat. Sara Bloomfield)
 "Set Me in the Sun" (feat. Sara Day Evans)
 "Bridges" (feat. Sara Bloomfield)
 "The Silence" (feat. Samantha Sandlin)
 "Hypnotized" (feat. Sara Bloomfield)
 "Messages" (feat. Sara Bloomfield)

Pandora's Box

 "Innocence" (04:57)
 "Mischief" (05:44)
 "Seduction" (05:43)
 "Epimetheus" (05:47)
 "Curiosity" (05:10)
 "Darkened Rooms" (06:17)
 "Who Are You" (05:23)
 "The Journey" (04:45)
 "Stolen Light" (04:48)
 "Shattered" (04:38)
 "Hope" (03:23)

Phoenix

 "Dream" (feat. Sara Bloomfield) (4:01)
 "Uncover Me" (feat. Samantha Duncan) (5:19)
 "Caged" (feat. Cody Gesumaria) (5:10)
 "Fairy Star" (feat. Sara Bloomfield) (5:48)
 "Speed" (feat. Samantha Duncan) (4:15)

Compendium

 "Déjà Vu" (feat. Sara Bloomfield) (4:21) 
 "Dreamcatcher" (feat. Sheyenne Rivers) (5:57)
 "Lotus Bloom" (feat. Sara Bloomfield) (4:55)
 "Uncover Me" (5:19)
 "Breathe" (4:07)
 "Open Sky" (feat. Samantha Sandlin Duncan) (5:39)
 "Epimetheus" (5:42) 
 "Worlds Apart" (feat. Sheyenne Rivers) (5:02)
 "Holy Ground" (5:25)
 "Set Me in the Sun" (feat. Sarah Day Evans) (4:20)
 "Labyrinth of Dreams" (feat. Maura Hurley) (4:55)
 "Warrior Heart" (feat. Sara Bloomfield) (5:08)
 "One Star" (feat. Stephanie Erato) (New) (5:56)
 "No Tears" (feat. Samantha Sandlin Duncan) (New) (5:02)
 "Serenity" (feat. Christine Bowman) (New) (5:02)
 "Te Deum" (written by Händel) (feat. Erin Nygard) (5:00)

Blues To My Soul 

"Get Yourself A Haircut" (4:23)
"Twee Fingers In A Nose" (2:59)
"Kansas City" (4:44)
"6ft Under" (5:12)
"Antares" (4:25)
"Moonshine Ride" (3:08)
"Relationshow Blues (Hey Hey)" (3:59)
"Light As A Bird" (3:51)
"Fuller Gearbox Blues" (2:54)
"Help You" (4:06)
"Blues To My Soul" (6:07)

Prophecy 

 "Raindrops" (4:28)
 "The Village" (5:45)
 "Karmic Moon" (3:47)
 "Acidity" (4:14)
 "Salem" (3:56)
 "The Road" (4:38)
 "The Spell" (3:37)
 "Run Deep" (4:17)
 "The Monk" (4:50)
 "Nature's Light" (4:17)
 "Sweet Dreams" (4:40)
 "Seeds of Change" (4:33)
 "Who Are You" (4:46)
 "Human Folly" (5:28)

References

External links
  Blue Stone Project Myspace
  Neurodisc Records Official Site
  Blue Stone interview with DJFIX for Breathe
  Conversation with Robert Smith of Blue Stone (Jamie Bonk interview for the album Breathe)
  Conversation with Robert Smith, Bill Walters and Sheyenne Rivers of Blue Stone for the album Worlds Apart
  Discogs

Electronic music groups from Florida